William Watts may refer to:
 William Watts (East India Company official) (c. 1722–1764), British official involved in the overthrow of the last independent ruler of Bengal
 William Watts (fl. 1512–1518), mayor of Reading
 William Watts (priest), Archdeacon of Llandaff, 1706–1722
 William Watts (engraver) (1752–1851), English line-engraver
 William Watts (colonial administrator), deputy governor of Anguilla
 William Watts (Virginian) (1817–1877), American politician and businessman in Virginia
 William Walter Watts (1856–1920), botanist - moss expert
 William Carleton Watts (1880–1956), rear admiral in US Navy
 William John Watts (1846–1907), Quebec businessman, lawyer and politician
 William Arthur Watts (1930–2010), botanist and educator
 William Whitehead Watts (1860–1947), geologist
 William Watts (inventor), inventor of the shot tower
 William Watts (translator) (1590–1649), English cleric and author
 William Mavor Watts (1797/98–1874), English printer
 Bill Watts (born 1939), American wrestler and promoter

See also
Billy Watts (disambiguation)
William Watt (disambiguation)